Yu Mai-lee (born 13 September 1952) is a Taiwanese gymnast. She competed in five events at the 1968 Summer Olympics.

References

1952 births
Living people
Taiwanese female artistic gymnasts
Olympic gymnasts of Taiwan
Gymnasts at the 1968 Summer Olympics
Taiwanese people from Zhejiang
20th-century Taiwanese women